Christmas Island District High School (CIDHS) is a public co-educational early learning, primary, and high day school located in Christmas Island, a territory of Australia.  the school served approximately 235 students from kindergarten through to Year 12. The school is operated by the Western Australian Department of Education.

Overview 
Landcare recognised the school's efforts to clear a  stretch of Greta Beach used as a nesting ground for the green turtle. The beach area is one of the dirtiest on the island as it traps debris brought in by currents. For these continuing efforts, the school was selected as a 2004 Western Australia Landcare Education Award Finalist.

On 5 March 2007, Governor-General of Australia, Michael Jeffery, visited the school and addressed the school assembly.

References

External links
 School overview, Department of Education (Western Australia)

Public high schools in Western Australia
High schools in Christmas Island
Educational institutions established in 1975
1975 establishments in Australia